The Santa Fe New Mexican or simply The New Mexican is a daily newspaper published in Santa Fe, New Mexico. Dubbed "the West's oldest newspaper," its first issue was printed on November 28, 1849.

Background 
The downtown offices for The New Mexican are located at 150 Washington Ave. in Santa Fe where the advertising, editorial, accounting, and administration departments are located.

Its notable writers include New York Times bestselling author Tony Hillerman, who served as executive editor in the early 1950s.

The New Mexican built a new 65,000 sq. ft. production building which was completed in November 2004, located at One New Mexican Plaza in Santa Fe. The first Santa Fe New Mexican newspaper was printed on the new KBA Comet press on November 1, 2004. The New Mexican also prints the Albuquerque Journal at this facility.

On May 20, 2011, The New Mexican purchased the assets of the Santa Fe Thrifty Nickel and took over ownership of the publication. The Thrifty Nickel publishes every Thursday for Northern New Mexico.

On March 29, 2012, it was announced that The New Mexican had won first place in the color division of the Inland Press Association's Print Contest. There are over 1,200 newspapers in the IPA group. The New Mexican won the black and white division in 2011.

The New Mexican is one of 26 New York Times national printing sites. The New Mexican is the largest commercial printer in New Mexico, printing several other newspapers and printed products. These are delivered throughout New Mexico and other states.

The New Mexican was named 2015 "Daily Newspaper of the Year" (circulation under 30,000 category) by the Local Media Association, a national organization of television, newspaper and radio companies. The New Mexican was cited for "detailed reporting, evocative writing and strong photography that give a powerful sense of place to its coverage,” by judges from the Craig Newmark Graduate School of Journalism at the City University of New York.

The paper was purchased by Robert M. McKinney, the late father of its current owner, in 1949. He sold it to Gannett in 1976 with a contract to retain editorial and managerial control. He sued the company in 1978 after an alleged a breach of contract, eventually winning back the paper in 1989.

See also
 List of newspapers in New Mexico

References

Newspapers published in New Mexico
Publications established in 1849
New Mexican
1849 establishments in New Mexico Territory